High School Confidential is a 1958 American crime drama film directed by Jack Arnold, starring Mamie Van Doren, Russ Tamblyn, Jan Sterling, John Drew Barrymore, Jackie Coogan, Diane Jergens and Michael Landon.

The film also features a cameo by Jerry Lee Lewis who opens the movie singing a song of the same name, which Lewis co-wrote with Ron Hargrave. Lewis released the title track as a Sun Records 45 single which became a Top 40 hit, reaching #21 in the Billboard charts. The film is listed in Golden Raspberry Award founder John Wilson's book The Official Razzie Movie Guide as one of The 100 Most Enjoyably Bad Movies Ever Made.

Plot
Mike Wilson, a young police officer, poses as a student under the alias Tony Baker and thus infiltrates a high school in order to investigate a narcotics ring. He lives in an apartment with Gwen Dulaine, a married woman who pretends to be his aunt in public but attempts to seduce him in private.

"Tony" flirts with pupil Joan Staples and incurs the wrath of teacher Arlene Williams as he makes acquaintances in school. He discovers that Joan uses marijuana and inquires about where she purchases it. He ultimately learns that a mysterious man known only as "Mr. A" is the one who sells drugs to the students, helped by an assistant called Bix.

With help from an undercover cop, Quinn, who risks his life to save Mike's, the criminals are apprehended and Joan promises Mike that her drug use is over.

Cast
Russ Tamblyn as Tony Baker/Mike Wilson
Jan Sterling as Arlene Williams
John Drew as J. I. Coleridge
Diane Jergens as Joan Staples
Mamie Van Doren as Gwen Dulaine
Jerry Lee Lewis as Himself
Ray Anthony as Bix
Jackie Coogan as Mr. 'Mr. A' August
Charles Chaplin Jr. as Quinn
Michael Landon as Steve Bentley
Lyle Talbot as William Remington Kane
Robin Raymond as Kitty
Burt Douglas as Jukey Judlow

Veteran character actor Charles Halton appears uncredited in his last role as Mr. Robinson, the high school principal.

Production
 
The film was based on an original script by Lewis Meltzer. It was produced by Albert Zugsmith, the first of a six-picture deal he had signed with MGM. MGM would get 75% of the profits, Zugmsith 25%.

In January 1958 Russ Tamblyn, who had just made Tom Thumb, was assigned to star. Filming started February 1958.

George Raft was meant to play a role but in March MGM announced Jackie Coogan would be playing the part instead. No explanation was given.

Box office
According to MGM records the film earned $1,290,000 in the US and Canada and $625,000 elsewhere, resulting in a profit of $578,000. However, the follow up films Zugsmith made for the studio, including The Beat Generation and Platinum High School, lost money.

In popular culture
This film is sampled on White Zombie's album La Sexorcisto: Devil Music, Vol. 1 on four separate occasions: the "Do you want to start a rumble?" conversation, the "Drop it, buster!" line, the "tomorrow's a drag" poem, and the Columbus speech ("the only thing square about this world...").

In the 1980 song "High School Confidential" by the Canadian new wave band Rough Trade (album: Avoid Freud), singer Carole Pope refers to the star of this film, Mamie Van Doren.

See also
 List of American films of 1958
 List of drug films
 List of hood films

References

External links
 
 
 
 Alan Arkush on High School Confidential at Trailers from Hell

1958 films
1950s English-language films
American black-and-white films
CinemaScope films
1958 crime drama films
1950s teen drama films
Films directed by Jack Arnold
Films scored by Albert Glasser
Metro-Goldwyn-Mayer films
American crime drama films
American teen drama films
1950s American films